St. Andrew's Cathedral was the Anglican Pro-cathedral of the former Canadian Diocese of Mackenzie River: it was in Fort Chipewyan but reverted to parish church status in 1933 when the diocese was abolished: it is the oldest Anglican church in Alberta.

References
 

Anglican church buildings in Alberta
19th-century Anglican church buildings in Canada